Zikri is both a given name and a surname. Notable people with the name include:

Zikri Akbar (born 1992), Indonesian footballer
Ali Yusuf Zikri, Libyan politician
Roei Zikri (born 1992), Israeli footballer

See also
Haziq Zikri Elias (born 1991), Malaysian footballer